William Ritchie may refer to:

 William Ritchie (barrister) (1817–1862), Advocate-General of Bengal
 William Ritchie (editor) (1781–1831), editor of The Scotsman
 William Ritchie (footballer) (1895–?), Scottish footballer
 William Ritchie (moderator) (1758–1830), Moderator of the General Assembly of the Church of Scotland
 William Ritchie (physicist) (1790–1837), physicist
 William E. Ritchie (died 1943), trick bicyclist
 William Gordon Ritchie (1918–1998), Manitoba politician
 Sir William Johnstone Ritchie (1813–1892), Chief Justice of Canada
 William Thomas Ritchie (1873–1945), Scottish cardiologist
 Bill Ritchie (1931–2010), cartoonist
 Bill Ritchie (politician) (1927–2014), Canadian politician
 Billy Ritchie (1936–2016), footballer
 Billy Ritchie (musician) (born 1944), British keyboard player and composer

 Willie Ritchie (golfer) (1884–1966), Scottish golfer

See also
 Willie Ritchie (1891–1975), boxer